Celebrity Farm was a 2003 Raidió Teilifís Éireann (RTÉ) reality television show, based on the international TV format The Farm, produced by Strix. Held along similar lines as I'm a Celebrity... Get Me Out of Here!, Celebrity Farm required eight of Ireland's C-List celebrities to spend seven days on a farm with one being voted off every evening (or "turfed out" as RTÉ called it). It was hosted by Ear to the Ground presenter Mairead McGuinness and the prize money was €50,000 to the charity of their choice.

Results
Evictions were decided via a public televote, where the contestant getting the most votes would be "turfed out".

1st evicted: Twink, pantomime actress

2nd evicted: Paddy O'Gorman, TV presenter

3rd evicted: Mary Coughlan, jazz musician

4th evicted: Kevin Sharkey, artist

5th evicted: Mary Kingston, children's TV presenter

6th evicted: Tamara Gervasoni, then Rose of Tralee

Runner-up: Gavin Lambe-Murphy, gossip columnist

Winner: George McMahon, soap actor

The show was won by George McMahon, an actor from Fair City. He split his prize money between a children's charity, a children's hospital and a centre for those with disabilities. Kevin Sharkey had a serious disagreement with the other "farmhands", as they were called, and subsequently refused to appear with them on The Late Late Show after the series, instead appearing on rival chat show The Dunphy Show.

Legacy
Celebrity Farm left a pitiful legacy for Irish television viewers. One witness reported that it had taken until 2012 "to finally stop shuddering at the memory of such sitting room atrocities as RTÉ's Celebrity Farm".

References

External links
 Celebrity Farm at RTÉ Television

2003 Irish television seasons
Irish reality television series
RTÉ original programming
The Farm (franchise)
2003 Irish television series debuts
2003 Irish television series endings
Television shows set on farms